Rossovich is a surname. Notable people with the surname include: 

 Rick Rossovich (born 1957), American actor
 Tim Rossovich (1946–2018), American football player and actor